Michal Gutwald (born 17 June 1993) is a Czech professional ice hockey defenceman who currently plays for Anglet Hormadi Élite in the French Ligue Magnus. He previously played with Cracovia Kraków in the Polska Hokej Liga.

Career
Gutwald began his career with HC Kladno and made his debut for the senior team during the 2011–12 Czech Extraliga season where he played one game. After spending the following season with HC 07 Detva of the Tipsport liga in Slovakia, Gutwald returned to Kladno in 2013.

Gutwald spent the 2016–17 season in Slovakia, playing in the Tipsport Liga for MsHK Žilina during the regular season, and in the 1. Liga for HK Dukla Michalovce during the playoffs.

On 1 November 2017 Gutwald moved to the United Kingdom to sign for the Braehead Clan based in Glasgow, Scotland.

After two seasons with the Clan, he moved to fellow Scottish team the Fife Flyers on 8 August 2019.

In August 2020, Gutwald moved to Polish side Cracovia Kraków. In 2021, Gutwald moved to French Ligue Magnus side Anglet Hormadi Élite.

References

External links

1993 births
Living people
Anglet Hormadi Élite players
HC Berounští Medvědi players
Braehead Clan players
Czech ice hockey defencemen
HC 07 Detva players
HK Dukla Michalovce players
Fife Flyers players
Glasgow Clan players
MKS Cracovia (ice hockey) players
Rytíři Kladno players
People from Slaný
MsHK Žilina players
Competitors at the 2017 Winter Universiade
Sportspeople from the Central Bohemian Region
Czech expatriate ice hockey players in Slovakia
Czech expatriate ice hockey people
Expatriate ice hockey players in Scotland
Expatriate ice hockey players in Poland
Expatriate ice hockey players in France
Czech expatriate sportspeople in France
Czech expatriate sportspeople in Poland
Czech expatriate sportspeople in Scotland